William Francis McMahon (January 3, 1910 – February 26, 1991) was an American long-distance runner. He won the national marathon championship in 1936 and qualified for the Olympic marathon in Berlin, where he failed to finish.

References

1910 births
1991 deaths
American male marathon runners
Sportspeople from Worcester, Massachusetts
Athletes (track and field) at the 1936 Summer Olympics
Olympic track and field athletes of the United States
Track and field athletes from Massachusetts